Margaret Hinchey (10 December 1870 – 29 February 1944) was an American suffragist, labor organizer, and leader. She was publicly active in these causes between 1912 and 1917.

Biography  
She was born on 10 December 1870 in Limerick, Ireland, to Thomas Hinchey and Mary Maloney. She migrated to New York City in 1897 and worked in a laundry.

In February, 1914, Hinchey spoke at a meeting of the Equal Suffrage League, recounting her meeting (along with 35 other women suffragists) with President Woodrow Wilson to push for women's suffrage. By 1920 she was working as a domestic servant.

She died in Manhattan, New York City on 29 February 1944.

References

1870 births
1944 deaths
American suffragists
American trade union leaders
Irish emigrants to the United States (before 1923)